Marguerite Émilie Julie Putsage (1868–1946) was a Belgian artist, particularly known for her portraits and flower paintings.

Biography 
Putsage was born on 15 November 1868 in Mons, the daughter of Jules Maximilien Joseph Putsage and Marie Thérèse Philippine De Puydt. Her father was director of the Union du Crédit in Mons. She taught an art history course at the École des Mines (which later became the Faculté polytechnique de Mons).

She died in Brussels on 22 September 1946.

Gallery

References

External links

1868 births
1946 deaths
People from Mons
19th-century Belgian women artists
20th-century Belgian women artists